Emmaus is an international solidarity movement founded in Paris in 1949 by Catholic priest and Capuchin friar Abbé Pierre to combat poverty and homelessness. Since 1971 regional and national initiatives have been grouped under a parent organization, Emmaus International, now run by Jean Rousseau, representing 350 groups in 37 countries, offering a range of charitable services.

Emmaus is a secular organisation, but communities around the world have kept the name because of its symbolism. The biblical story, found in the Gospel of Luke, describes how two men saw the resurrected Jesus on the road to the town of Emmaus, and so regained hope. The organization's guiding principle can be found in the Universal Manifesto of Emmaus International:

History

The first Emmaus Community was founded by Father Henri-Antoine Groues (known as Abbé Pierre) in Paris in 1949. The former Resistance member was also an MP who fought to provide accommodation for the homeless people of Paris. He was assisted by another former Resistance member, Lucie Coutaz.

Abbé Pierre also took on the first Emmaus Companion, a former convict called Georges who had attempted suicide in the Seine. George helped to build temporary homes for those in need (initially in the priest's own garden), and then on any land they could obtain.

From Parliament in 1951, Abbé Pierre dedicated himself to the homeless cause. He struggled to pay Georges and the first 18 members of the Emmaus Community. The priest was rebuffed by his Church for begging at restaurants and so organised 'rag pickers' to collect unwanted items for resale. This formed the basis of Emmaus Communities raising funds and using profits to help others.

The harsh winter of 1954 led to a number of homeless people's deaths and Abbé Pierre appealed through the newspapers and on the radio for donations. The French people responded and Emmaus grew from a national charity into an international one. Emmaus Communities now began to appear across Europe, French West Africa, the Far East and South America.

By 2017 there were 400 Emmaus organisations in 44 countries.

Emmaus in the UK
The first British Emmaus Community appeared in Cambridge in 1992. It was set up by Selwyn Image, who had been a student volunteer at an Emmaus Community in Paris. The charity provides formerly homeless people with a home and work, usually collecting, sorting and reselling donated furniture and household goods. Emmaus UK acts as a central resource to local Emmaus Communities across the UK. As of September 2016, there are 28 Emmaus Communities operating in the UK, with others under development. These communities provide accommodation and meaningful work for formerly homeless people.

People involved or associated with Emmaus
Abbé Pierre
Terry Waite
Camilla, Queen Consort
HomeSense
Mehran Karimi Nasseri
Tracy Edwards
David Kirk

See also 
Emmaus Mouvement
Emmabuntüs
Poverty reduction

References

Further reading

External links
Emmaus International, Abbé Pierre’s sole legatee

Charities based in France
International charities
Homelessness charities
Organizations established in 1949